Healthgrades Operating Company Inc., known as Healthgrades, is a US company that provides information about physicians, hospitals and health care providers. Healthgrades has amassed information on over 3 million U.S. health care providers. The company was founded by Kerry Hicks, David Hicks, Peter Fatianow, John Neal, and Sarah Lochran, and is based in Denver, Colorado. Rob Draughon serves as the company's CEO. According to USA Today, Healthgrades is the first comprehensive physician rating and comparison database. The application is part of a trend in health technology in the United States towards consumer-driven healthcare.

History
Kerry Hicks founded Healthgrades in 1998. Prior to founding Healthgrades, Hicks served as CEO of its predecessor company, Specialty Care Network. In 2008, Healthgrades acquired Ailjor, an online healthcare directory. Healthcare providers had the ability to display their business information on the website for the community to view. In 2009, Healthgrades worked with over 400 hospitals in the United States.

An affiliate of Vestar Capital Partners, a private equity firm, acquired Healthgrades in 2010. Healthgrades merged with CPM Marketing Group, a Madison, Wisconsin based company that provides customer relationship management solutions to hospitals. CPM Marketing became CPM Healthgrades, a division of Healthgrades, and now operates as Healthgrades Hospital Solutions group. The merger created a single online company with more than 200 million visitors annually.

In October 2014, Healthgrades launched the first comprehensive physician rating and comparison database in the United States. The database allows users to search for physicians based on their experience in a particular area or procedure. The database's launch coincided with the release of a company-produced report that showed widely varying complication rates for total knee replacement surgeries across 17 Denver-area hospitals. On August 4, 2021 the Healthgrades.com marketplace was sold to Red Ventures while the technology and data platform division rebranded to Mercury Healthcare.

Ratings
Healthgrades evaluates hospitals solely on risk adjusted mortality and in-hospital complications. Its website evaluates roughly 500 million claims from federal and private reviews and data to rate and rank doctors based on complication rates at the hospitals where they practice, experience, and patient satisfaction. Its analysis is based on approximately 40 million Medicare discharges for the most recent three-year time period available. Hospital rating reports for specific procedures and diagnoses are compiled primarily from Medicare claim data, and include all hospitals that are Medicare participants. Some critics argue that claim data is not adequate enough to make determinations about the quality of care and that conclusions should be drawn from medical records. Peer-reviewed research has shown that measures of mortality and complication rates based on administrative data can be used as a measure of clinical quality. Ratings are updated yearly, but data is two years old before Medicare releases it.

Healthgrades develops objective ratings based on data and information obtained from several sources, mostly available to the public. The data is analyzed using a proprietary methodology that identifies the recipients of the various awards and the "1-3-5 Star" designation. Specifically, most ratings are determined from multivariate logistic regressions of medical outcomes at a given healthcare provider to risk-adjust the patients and 1-, 3- and 5-star awards are given to providers whose negative outcomes are worse than expected, near predicted levels, and better than expected, respectively. The ratings have been criticized for oversights in the methodology that may actually penalize some institutions with ideal medical outcomes. Nash et al. have expressed "concern about the reliability and validity of such 'black box' rating scales."

In addition to star ratings, Healthgrades recognizes facilities for: America's 50 and 100 Best Hospitals, Distinguished Hospitals for Clinical Excellence, and Excellence Awards in 26 areas. The Clinical Excellence awards bestowed by Healthgrades are intended to help patients make an informed choice about where to get treated.

Products

Website
Time listed the Healthgrades website as one of its 50 best websites of 2011. The information Healthgrades provides includes information on doctors' board certifications, types of procedures offered, and which insurance plans offices accept.  However, information such as healthcare provider degrees is often inaccurate on the site, significantly limiting its use and raising concern that other information on the site may also be incorrect. It also lists a doctor's hospital affiliations and information on hospital performance collected from government data. Web visitors can input their opinions in a survey based on their experience with an individual health care professional, and view provider ratings at no charge. The survey evaluates a doctor's communication skills, the friendliness of the office staff, and whether it's easy to get an urgent appointment. Healthgrades was featured in a study analyzing the trends of online ratings of otolaryngologists that was published in JAMA in 2014. The study confirmed that although physician's feelings toward the presence of online rating websites tend to be negative, the awareness of and the use of them by patients has increased and may actually help physicians manage their online reputation.

According to comScore, Healthgrades began receiving approximately 17 million unique visitors a month in January 2014. Many companies and health plans make Healthgrades information available to their participants. Healthgrades also owns the website, BetterMedicine.com.

Licensing
Hospitals that are highly rated providers will license Healthgrades' ratings and trademarks to use in their marketing promotions. The company uses litigation to protect its name and ratings. Healthgrades sued the Robert Wood Johnson University Hospital in 2006 for copyright and trademark infringement after the hospital used Healthgrades' ratings and logo in promotional publications without paying licensing fees.

Consulting
Healthgrades provides consulting services to more than 350 hospitals for recommendations on how to preserve or improve their quality of care, as well as marketing and business development.

Independent evaluation
Medical experts have questioned the reliability of the 1-, 3- and 5-star ratings given to healthcare providers, criticizing the lack of transparency and perceived oversights in Healthgrades' methodology.

A study published in JAMA in 2002 reported that Healthgrades ratings for mortality associated with acute myocardial infarction identified "groups of hospitals differing in the aggregate in quality of care and outcomes" but heterogeneity within the ratings for individual hospitals could not reliably discriminate between individual hospitals in quality of care or mortality. To illustrate: for any pair of hospitals rated to two different rating groups (1-, 3- or 5-star) by Healthgrades, the researchers determined that standardized mortality rates were "comparable or even better in the lower-rated hospital in more than 90% of the comparisons."

The Rocky Mountain News concluded that Healthgrades had inaccurate physician disciplinary records (while competitor ChoicePoint had much greater accuracy) in 2004. The report also detailed the complaints of former Healthgrades employees and physicians that pursued legal actions after inaccurate reports.

Research published in Journal of the American College of Surgeons in 2010, compared mortality in U.S. News & World Report and Healthgrades lists of "Best Hospitals" for abdominal aortic aneurysm repair, coronary artery bypass, aortic valve repair and mitral valve repair. Risk-adjusted mortality was found to be statistically significantly lower in the Healthgrades' "Best Hospitals" for coronary artery bypass and aortic valve repair.

A similar study published in Archives of Surgery in 2011 evaluated Healthgrades and U.S. News & World Report ratings in oncologic surgeries, comparing top-rated hospitals in the two reports to all other U.S. hospitals. The authors determined that both ratings systems had substantive flaws in the evaluation of mortality following pancreatectomy, esophagectomy or colectomy; only the top rated hospitals for colectomy in the U.S. News & World Report ratings had a statistically significant lower mortality than national averages—mortality rates at Healthgrades' best hospitals were not significantly lower for any of the three procedures.

Criticism 
In 2010, AOL criticized the company for its use of "automatic renewal" subscription charges to customers who purchased physician reports.  Healthgrades discontinued all consumer-based credit card product offerings in 2011.  ConsumerAffairs.com shows an unfavorable rating of Healthgrades.com, listing allegations of inaccurate healthcare provider information, modified or falsified reviews left by consumers, and an inability to properly validate reviews prior to being posted.  A 2016 article published in Consumer Reports identified a case where Healthgrades failed to divulge 18 malpractice suits against Leonard Kurian, a physician reviewed on its site, bringing into question the quality of reviews it provides.  Healthgrades will disable and remove therapy and psychology accounts if requested.

Healthgrades Help Center FAQs  states providers who have received an unsatisfactory patient survey may improve their overall survey score: “The best strategy to improve your overall survey score is to encourage more of your patients to complete Patient Satisfaction Surveys. The more patient surveys you have, the less impact a few unsatisfactory scores have on your overall survey score. Use our Patient Engagement Resources to help you encourage patients to complete surveys.”  This suggestion to providers from Healthgrades violates both National Association of Social Workers Code of Ethics and American Psychological Code of Ethics:  The Code of Ethics of the National Association of Social Workers, Section 4.07, states that it is unethical for social workers to solicit testimonials: "(b) Social workers should not engage in solicitation of testimonial endorsements (including solicitation of consent to use a client's prior statement as a testimonial endorsement) from current clients or other persons who, because of their particular circumstances are vulnerable to undue influence." Also, The American Psychological Association's Ethics Code states that it is unethical for psychologists to solicit testimonials: Principle 5.05 "Psychologists do not solicit testimonials from current therapy clients/patients or other persons who because of their particular circumstances are vulnerable."  Healthgrades purports to assist consumers in selecting quality health care providers while simultaneously advising providers to engage in unethical practice by utilizing Heathgrades Patient Engagement Resources, bringing into question the quality and integrity of reviews it provides.

Call center workers at Healthgrades are told to pose as official workers for the hospital systems that have contracted them. The phone numbers listed for various doctors on the Healthgrades website actually lead directly to the Healthgrades call center, located at 1117 Deming Way in Madison, WI. The  agents are tasked with collecting all of a patient's demographic information. HIPAA laws prohibit medical providers from marketing to patients; so Healthgrades poses as a, "physician referral service" and a, "free service to the community" for the hospital systems, collecting a patient's name, date of birth, social security number, phone number, and physical address. The information can then be used for marketing purposes.

References

External links
Healthgrades.com
CPMHealthgrades.com
BetterMedicine.com
RightDiagnosis.com/

Similar sites
 WebMD.com
Vitals.com

American medical websites
Health care companies established in 1998
Companies based in Denver
Privately held companies based in Colorado
Bibliographic database providers
Medical and health organizations based in Colorado